Habenaria macroceratitis, the big-horn bog orchid or long-horned false rein orchid, is a species of orchid closely related to H. quinqueseta and often mistaken for it. Habenaria macroceratitis is native to Central America, Mexico, the West Indies (Cuba, Jamaica, Hispaniola), northern South America (Colombia, Venezuela, the Guianas), and Florida.

References

macroceratitis
Orchids of South America
Orchids of Mexico
Orchids of Central America
Flora of Florida
Flora of the Caribbean
Plants described in 1759
Flora without expected TNC conservation status